The 19th Military Airlift Squadron is an inactive United States Air Force unit. It was last assigned to the 62d Military Airlift Wing, Military Airlift Command, stationed at McChord Air Force Base, Washington. It was inactivated on 22 December 1969.

History

World War II

The first predecessor of the squadron was activated at Salt Lake City Army Air Base, Utah in July 1942 as the 363d Bombardment Squadron, one of the four original squadrons of the 304th Bombardment Group.  In September, the squadron moved to Geiger Field, Washington, where it received its first personnel and began training with Boeing B-17 Flying Fortresses, but soon moved to Virginia and switched to the Consolidated B-24 Liberator.

After its arrival on the eastern seaboard, the squadron began antisubmarine warfare patrols.  In November, it was renamed the 19th Antisubmarine Squadron and in December, its parent 304th Bombardment Group, whose squadrons had dispersed to various locations, was inactivated and the squadron was assigned to the 25th Antisubmarine Wing, which supervised Army Air Forces throughout the Atlantic coast.  The Navy believed that more antisubmarine forces were required to protect convoys in the North Atlantic, where attacks were becoming more concentrated.  In March, the 19th Antisubmarine Squadron relocated to Gander Airport in Newfoundland, soon joined by two other squadrons.

US Army Air Forces Antisubmarine Command had moved some of its north American based antisubmarine squadrons to England in December 1942 as the 2037th Antisubmarine Wing (Provisional), but those early squadrons had subsequently been moved-on to airfields in French Morocco, where they were formed-up into the newly created 480th Antisubmarine Group under the control of the United States Navy Fleet Air Wing 15, part of the Moroccan Sea Frontier.  

To replace them, the antisubmarine squadrons in Newfoundland, including the 19th, were moved to RAF St Eval in Cornwall in March 1943, where they formed the 479th Antisubmarine Group under the control of No. 19 Group of RAF Coastal Command.  The group conducted patrols over the Bay of Biscay in coordination with the RAF Coastal Command, achieving its greatest success in the first two months it was in action.  Following this period, German U-boats adopted tactics that kept them submerged in the group's area of operations during daylight hours.  The 479th Group continued its patrols, occasionally engaging Luftwaffe aircraft until October.  The 479th Group was disbanded in England in November, along with the 19th Squadron.

Special Weapons transportation
The second predecessor of the unit was established as the 19th Logistic Support Squadron in 1952 as the first of three logistic support squadrons organized by Air Materiel Command.  Its mission was to provide worldwide airlift of nuclear weapons and related equipment, with a secondary mission to airlift other Department of Defense cargo as required when space was available. 

In 1963, Military Air Transport Service assumed the mission of transporting special weapons and the squadron was reassigned to the 62d Troop Carrier Wing, one of the command's two C-124 troop carrier wings.  Shortly before its inactivation, its mission changed to that of strategic transport squadron flying worldwide airlift operations. It was inactivated in 1969 with the retirement of the C-124.

In 1985 the two squadrons were consolidated and redesignated as the 19th Aeromedical Airlift Squadron.

Lineage
 19th Antisubmarine Squadron
 Constituted as the 363d Bombardment Squadron (Heavy) on 28 January 1942
 Activated on 15 July 1942
 Redesignated 19th Antisubmarine Squadron (Heavy) on 29 November 1942
 Disbanded on 11 November 1943
 Reconstituted on 19 September 1985 and consolidated with the 19th Military Airlift Squadron as the 19th Aeromedical Airlift Squadron

 19th Military Airlift Squadron
 Constituted as the 19th Logistic Support Squadron on 1 September 1952
 Activated on 23 September 1952
 Redesignated 19th Air Transport Squadron, Special on 8 July 1964 1965
 Redesignated 19th Military Airlift Squadron, Special on 27 December 1965
 Redesignated 19th Military Airlift Squadron on 8 April 1969
 Inactivated on 22 December 1969
 Consolidated with the 19th Antisubmarine Squadron as the 19th Aeromedical Airlift Squadron on 19 September 1985

Assignments
 304th Bombardment Group, 15 July 1942
 25th Antisubmarine Wing, 30 December 1942
 Army Air Forces Antisubmarine Command, 8 June 1943
 479th Antisubmarine Group, 8 July – 11 November 1943
 San Antonio Air Materiel Area, 23 September 1952
 3079th Aviation Depot Wing, 6 February 1955
 39th Logistic Support Group, 8 July 1962
 62d Troop Carrier Wing (later 62d Air Transport Wing, 62d Military Airlift Wing), 1 July 1963 – 22 December 1969

Stations
 Salt Lake City Army Air Base, Utah, 15 July 1942
 Geiger Field, Washington, 15 September 1942
 Ephrata Army Air Field, Washington, 1 October 1942
 Langley Field, Virginia, 29 October 1942 – 19 March 1943
 Gander Airport, Newfoundland, 19 March – c. 25 June 1943
 RAF St Eval (Station 129), England, C. 30 June 1943
 RAF Dunkeswell (Station 173), England, 6 August 1943
 RAF Podington, England (Station 109), 11 November 1943
 Kelly Air Force Base, Texas, 23 September 1952 – 22 December 1969

Aircraft
 Boeing B-17 Flying Fortress, 1942
 Consolidated B-24 Liberator, 1942–1944
 Douglas C-124 Globemaster II 1952–1969

References

 Notes

 Citations

Bibliography

 
 . 
 
 
 
 
  
 

 Further reading
 

019
Military units and formations disestablished in 1969